Honey Creek School is a historic one-room school building located in Benton Township, Monroe County, Indiana.  It was built in 1921, and is a one-story, Bungalow / American Craftsman influenced balloon frame building on a fieldstone foundation.  The main section has a hipped roof and a projecting gable roofed entry is topped by a belfry with a pyramidal roof. The school closed in 1945. The building was restored in 1975.

It was listed on the National Register of Historic Places in 1978.

References

One-room schoolhouses in Indiana
School buildings on the National Register of Historic Places in Indiana
Bungalow architecture in Indiana
School buildings completed in 1921
Schools in Monroe County, Indiana
National Register of Historic Places in Monroe County, Indiana
1921 establishments in Indiana